Special Agent K-7 is a 1937 American mystery film directed by Raymond K. Johnson and starring Walter McGrail, Queenie Smith and Irving Pichel. It was based on the radio series of the same title.

Synopsis
FBI Special Agent K-7 Vince Landers (McGrail) investigates a series of crimes that includes the murders of Tony Black (Renaldo) and Eddie Geller (Castello). Billy Westrop (Reed) is the prime suspect.

Cast
Walter McGrail as Vince Landers
Queenie Smith as Olive O'Day
Irving Pichel as Lester Owens
Donald Reed as Billy Westrop
Willy Castello as Eddie Geller
Duncan Renaldo as Tony Black
 Joy Hodges as Peppy
 Richard Tucker as John Adams - Chief Agent
 Malcolm McGregor as Silky Samuels 
 Hans Joby as Schmidt
 George Eldredge as Ames - Prosecuting Attorney
 Henri Menjou as Smaltz 
 David MacDonald as Goodwin
 William Royle as Police Capt. Hall
 Harry Harvey as Speedy
 James Guilfoyle as Kennedy
 'Snub' Pollard as Waiter at Geller's Club
 John Ince as Judge J.B. Ellis

References

Bibliography
 Langman, Larry & Finn, Daniel. A Guide to American Crime Films of the Thirties. Greenwood Press, 1995.

External links
 
 
 
 

1937 films
1937 drama films
American black-and-white films
American mystery drama films
Films based on radio series
1930s mystery drama films
Films directed by Raymond K. Johnson
1930s English-language films
1930s American films